Church of Saint Virgin Mary in Rakaŭ is a Catholic church in Minsk Region, Belarus. It was constructed between 1904 and 1906 on the bank of the Islach river and consecrated in the name of Our Lady of the Rosary. The church is listed as a Belarusian Cultural Heritage object.

The Catholic parish in Rakaŭ was established in 1676, and the first wooden church was built then. In ten years it became a part of the Dominican monastery. The church was destroyed by fire in 1712 and 1812, but restored both times. In 1835 the monastery was closed and the church became a parish.

Between 1904 and 1906 the current Neo-Gothic stone church was constructed on the site of the former wooden one. The new church was made of yellow bricks and decorated with counterforts, peaked windows and arches, and a rose window in the main facade.

Gallery

References

Sources 

Churches in Belarus
Landmarks in Belarus